WrestleMania IV was the fourth annual WrestleMania professional wrestling pay-per-view (PPV) event produced by the World Wrestling Federation (WWF, now WWE). It took place on March 27, 1988, at Trump Plaza in Atlantic City, New Jersey. The announced attendance of the event was 19,199, drawing a 6.5 buyrate on PPV.

The main event featured the finals of a one-night, 14-man single-elimination tournament for the WWF World Heavyweight Championship, in which Macho Man Randy Savage defeated "The Million Dollar Man" Ted DiBiase to win the vacant title. This marked the first WrestleMania that did not feature Hulk Hogan - regarded as the WWF's biggest star in the 1980s - as a participant the main event (though he was at ringside in Savage's corner).

The undercard featured a 20-man battle royal won by Bad News Brown, Demolition (Ax and Smash) versus Strike Force (Tito Santana and Rick Martel) for the WWF Tag Team Championship, and Brutus "The Barber" Beefcake versus The Honky Tonk Man for the WWF Intercontinental Heavyweight Championship.

Production

Background
WrestleMania is considered the World Wrestling Federation's (WWF, now WWE) flagship pay-per-view (PPV) event, having first been held in 1985. It is held annually between mid-March to mid-April. WrestleMania IV was scheduled to be held on March 27, 1988, at the Historic Atlantic City Convention Hall in Atlantic City, New Jersey. This event was advertised as being held at the Trump Plaza Hotel and Casino, but taking place across the road at Convention Hall and sponsored by Donald Trump.

Much of the promotion of the event featured the continued rivalry of André the Giant and Hulk Hogan, who had faced off in the previous edition's main event. This took place inside of a single elimination fourteen-man tournament for the vacant WWF World Heavyweight Championship. The event was broadcast across closed circuit television to 175,000 homes, and also on PPV.

Storylines
WrestleMania IV featured a card, which contained matches that involved wrestlers from pre-existing scripted feuds, plots and storylines. Wrestlers portrayed either a villainous or fan favorite gimmick as they followed a series of events which generally built tension, leading to a wrestling match. The name of a wrestler's character was not always the person's birth name, as wrestlers often use a stage name to portray their character. As a narrative, events are usually pre-planned in order to promote a show or match. The main plotline for the event featured a fourteen-man tournament, including a rematch of WrestleMania III's main event.

André vs Hogan

The most heavily promoted feud heading into the event was between Hulk Hogan and André the Giant, similar to the year before when the two met at WrestleMania III. In January 1987, Hogan was awarded a trophy for his third year as WWF World Heavyweight Champion, while Hogan's on-screen friend André was awarded a smaller trophy than Hogan's for being undefeated in the WWF for the previous fifteen years. Hogan congratulated André over winning the award, but André exited the arena before Hogan's speech was finished. In February, on an episode of Piper's Pit, André announced his new manager, Bobby Heenan, Hogan's longtime on-screen rival. Hogan asked André to leave Heenan, to which André refused. André then challenged Hogan to a WWF World Heavyweight Championship match at WrestleMania III, before ripping off Hogan's Hulkamania shirt and golden cross necklace, turning from an on-screen hero to villain (heel). At WrestleMania III Hogan defeated André to retain the title. 

At the first Survivor Series in November 1987, André along with team members One Man Gang, King Kong Bundy, Butch Reed and Rick Rude defeated Hogan, Paul Orndorff, Don Muraco, Ken Patera and Bam Bam Bigelow in a traditional Survivor Series match. Shortly after Survivor Series, during Hogan's WWF World Heavyweight Championship defense against Bundy, André sneak-attacked Hogan, applying a chokehold. Heel character Ted DiBiase, who was portrayed as "The Million Dollar Man", an evil millionaire, offered Hogan a large sum of money to sell DiBiase the WWF World Heavyweight Championship, to which Hogan refused. At the first Royal Rumble in January 1988, Hogan and André had an official contract signing for a WWF World Heavyweight Championship rematch. Their rematch took place on The Main Event I in February, where André defeated Hogan with a dusty finish. André won the match when referee Dave Hebner's identical twin Earl Hebner made the decision. 

Shortly after being awarded the championship, André kayfabe sold the title to DiBiase. Whilst André's championship reign is recognized by the WWF, DiBiase was stripped of the title. Plotwise, WWF President Jack Tunney vacated the title due to it having not been won in a sanctioned match and ordered it to be decided in a single elimination 14-man tournament at WrestleMania IV. As previous champions, André and Hogan received byes to the second round of the tournament, but faced each other in their second-round matchup.

Hogan formed an unlikely alliance with a former enemy and top challenger to his WWF World Heavyweight Championship, Randy "Macho Man" Savage (which was later known as the Mega Powers). Savage had been portrayed as an egomaniacal heel during most of his first two years in the WWF, but in the late summer of 1987 began to slowly turn face. Their on-screen friendship, then, was formed when Hogan (at the persuasion of Savage's valet, Miss Elizabeth) intervened when Savage was being attacked by The Honky Tonk Man and the Hart Foundation in an angle. Although Hogan and Savage teamed together at un-televised house shows, nothing more was made of it on national television until shortly before WrestleMania IV, when Hogan rescued Savage in a similar angle featuring Andre, DiBiase and Virgil.

Undercard
Lower on the card, Brutus Beefcake was challenging for the WWF Intercontinental Championship, held by The Honky Tonk Man. Beefcake - who had the gimmick of a haircutter who regularly cut wrestler's hair after matches – had previous experience of Honky having tagged previously - had vowed: "to cut his ducktail hair." Honky, meanwhile, was portrayed as a cowardly champion, frequently relying on outside interference from manager Jimmy Hart or on-screen girlfriend Peggy Sue to win matches, or intentionally getting himself counted out or disqualified to retain his championship with the champions advantage.

Having debuted the year previously, in his first major feud, The Ultimate Warrior began battling with Hercules over which character was the stronger, gladiatorial-style superstar was in the WWF. During a match on WWF television, Hercules attacked Warrior with his steel chain after a chain match in an angle. The British Bulldogs and The Islanders had feuded since the late fall of 1987. The Islanders took the Bulldogs' mascot, Matilda the bulldog, from ringside. Bobby Heenan, manager of the Islanders commented on the legality of having animals at ringside rather than official managers. This included a remark on Koko B. Ware's macaw who accompanied him to ringside. This led to a Six-man tag team match with manager Heenan tagging with the Islanders against the Bulldogs and Ware.

Event

Opening match, 20-man battle-royal 

WrestleMania IV's coverage began with Gladys Knight singing a rendition of "America the Beautiful". The first match of the pay-per-view event was a twenty-man over the top rope battle royal. The winner of the match would receive a trophy. After fourteen eliminations, the final six participants were Bad News Brown, Bret Hart, Paul Roma, Harley Race, Jacques Rougeau, and Junkyard Dog.

Race hit a back body drop on Rougeau sending him over the top rope before Junkyard Dog punched him over the top rope. Brown eliminated Roma as Junkyard Dog was left to battle Hart and Brown. The duo double teamed Dog before Brown attempted a clothesline on Dog but hit Hart instead. Junkyard Dog hit both men with several headbutts before they both decided to cooperate and they eliminated Junkyard Dog. After eliminating Dog, Hart indicated that he and Brown would share the trophy; however, Brown caught Hart with his Ghetto Blaster before eliminating him over the top rope to win the battle royal. Brown was presented with the trophy, but Hart interrupted and hit Brown with the trophy. Hart and partner Jim Neidhart later turned babyface over the next few months.

First round 
Before the 14-man tournament for the WWF World Heavyweight Championship began, Robin Leach from the TV show "Lifestyles of the Rich and Famous" outlined the background for the tournament, and how the championship was vacated. As former champions, André the Giant and Hulk Hogan were given a bye and had directly qualified for the next round. In the first round, "The Million Dollar Man" Ted DiBiase (with bodyguard Virgil and André the Giant) defeated "Hacksaw" Jim Duggan by pinfall. "The Rock" Don Muraco (with Superstar Billy Graham) defeated Dino Bravo (with Frenchy Martin) by disqualification after Bravo pulled the referee in front of him, causing the referee to be hit by a flying forearm from Muraco.

"Macho Man" Randy Savage (with Miss Elizabeth) defeated "The Natural" Butch Reed (with Slick), Greg "The Hammer" Valentine (with "The Mouth of the South" Jimmy Hart) defeated Ricky "The Dragon" Steamboat, the One Man Gang (with Slick) defeated Bam Bam Bigelow (with Oliver Humperdink), and "Ravishing" Rick Rude (with Bobby "The Brain" Heenan) fought Jake "The Snake" Roberts to a time limit draw. The winners of these matches advanced to the quarterfinals. As Rude and Roberts tied, they were both eliminated from the tournament, thereby giving the One Man Gang a bye into the semifinals.

Tournament intermission one, singles match 
In his PPV debut, The Ultimate Warrior faced Hercules. The pair locked up with Warrior chopping Hercules in the corner. Hercules fought back as he hit two clotheslines on Warrior, who no-sold them before a third from Hercules took Warrior off his feet. Warrior then countered a Hercules clothesline and hit a clothesline of his own. In the corner, Warrior hit him with ten punches, but while Warrior was looking at the referee, Hercules hit an inverted atomic drop. He then tried to apply his finishing move, a full-nelson but could not lock his fingers behind Warriors head. Warrior then pushed his feet off the top turnbuckle and both men fell to the mat with both men being pinned.  Warrior lifted a shoulder before the end of the count, awarding Warrior the win.

Quarter-finals 

The first of three quarterfinals saw Hulk Hogan take on André the Giant. During the match, Hogan hit André with a chair in front of referee Joey Marella. André retaliated, grabbing the chair and hitting Hogan. After both men hit each other with the chair, they both were disqualified by Marella and, as a result, were eliminated from the tournament.

The second quarterfinal saw Ted DiBiase (without either André or Virgil after Virgil had been Suplexed in the aisle by Hulk Hogan) defeat Don Muraco by pinfall. With both André and Hogan disqualified, DiBiase got a bye to the final. The third quarterfinal saw Randy Savage defeat Greg Valentine also by pinfall. As One Man Gang had received a bye in the quarter-finals due to Rick Rude and Jake Roberts having wrestled to a time limit draw in the first round Gang faced Savage in the semi-finals.

Tournament intermission two, Intercontinental title match and six-man tag team match 
Brutus "The Barber" Beefcake fought WWF Intercontinental Champion The Honky Tonk Man for the Intercontinental championship. Early in the match, Beefcake connected with an atomic drop at the outset of the matchup. Beefcake then hit Honky with a high knee, before missing an elbow drop on Honky, who took control with a second turnbuckle fist drop. Honky went for his Swinging neckbreaker called Shake, Rattle & Roll on Beefcake but instead Beefcake kneed him in the face. Beefcake put Honky in a sleeper hold. With Beefcake in charge of the match, Honky's manager Jimmy Hart hit the referee with his megaphone. The bell didn't ring but it was announced that Beefcake won by disqualification, which meant that Honky was still the champion. Post-match, with Honky Tonk apparently knocked out in the ring, Beefcake cut the hair of Hart with his barber shears.

The Islanders (Haku and Tama) and manager Bobby Heenan took on The British Bulldogs (Davey Boy Smith and Dynamite Kid) and Koko B. Ware in a six-man tag team match. Dynamite and Tama started the match with Dynamite catapulting Tama over the top rope. Smith tagged in but missed an elbow drop on Tama, allowing Tama to tag Haku. Smith hit a flying crossbody on Haku for a near-fall. Haku hit an arm wrench and tagged Tama. Tama grabbed Smith's arm and came out of it with a military press slam. Tama tagged in Haku who put Davey in a backbreaker but Smith flipped out of it and tagged in Koko. He hit Haku with a missile dropkick and a Frankensteiner. Dynamite tagged in and clotheslined Haku before ran into Haku's boot. As a cowardly manager, Heenan tagged and stomped Dynamite before quickly tagging out to Tama. Tama hit a back body drop on Dynamite but missed a big splash to allow Dynamite to tag Koko whilst Tama tagged Haku. Both members of the Islanders squared up to Koko prompting the Bulldogs to enter the ring. All six men brawled in the ring before being separated by the referee, who ordered the Bulldogs into their corner. The Islanders used this distraction to pick up Heenan and throw him onto Koko, leading to a pinfall victory.

Semi-finals 
Next, Randy Savage faced One Man Gang for a place in the final of the tournament. Ted DiBiase had already received a bye in the semi-finals due to the double disqualification of Hulk Hogan and André the Giant and met the victor. Savage hit a hotshot on the One Man Gang, but Gang quickly took control of the match. Gang attempted a 747 splash, but missed after Savage dodged and later fell to the outside as Savage connected with a diving double axe handle. Savage then went for a scoop slam which failed. One Man Gang's manager Slick jumped on the apron and handed One Man Gang a cane; which he hit Savage with and attempted to jab him as he lay on the mat but Savage kept rolling away. The referee caught Gang using his cane and disqualified him awarding the match to Savage.

Tournament intermission three, Tag-team title match 
Before the final round, Strike Force (Tito Santana and Rick Martel) defended the WWF World Tag Team Championship against Demolition (Ax and Smash) with their manager Mr. Fuji in their corner. The match started with Strike Force hitting Smash with a double back elbow for a near-fall. Santana applied an armbar on Ax before Martel tagged in and applied an armbar but Ax headbutted him and tagged out to Smash. Santana tagged in but was caught in a bear hug and was clotheslined by Ax, before a scoop slam and suplex on Santana. Santana hit a flying forearm smash on an interfering Smash and tagged in Martel who dropkicked both Ax and Smash a number of times and applied a Boston crab on Smash. Santana grabbed Mr. Fuji up onto the apron, allowing Ax to get his manager's cane. He nailed Martel with it as Smash covered Martel with a pin. As a result, Demolition won the match, and the WWF Tag Team Championships.

Main event, WWF title tournament final 
The main event of WrestleMania IV was the tournament final for the vacant WWF World Heavyweight Championship between "Macho Man" Randy Savage and "The Million Dollar Man" Ted DiBiase. DiBiase was accompanied to the ring by Andre The Giant, whilst Savage his regular valet Miss Elizabeth. Savage had wrestled three prior matches, whilst DiBiase had wrestled one fewer, having received a bye from the quarterfinals. DiBiase controlled much of the match, before a fightback from Savage, who attempted a top rope elbow drop on DiBiase but DiBiase moved out of the way. DiBiase applied a Million Dollar Dream submission on Savage. To aid Savage, Elizabeth went backstage to bring Hulk Hogan to ringside to neutralize André being at ringside.

André the Giant interfered in the match on behalf of DiBiase, and whilst the referee was distracted, Hogan attacked DiBiase with a steel chair. Freed from the submission, Savage climbed up the top rope for a second elbow drop attempt and hit the Diving Elbow. He followed it up with a pinfall victory. He won the tournament and the vacant WWF World Heavyweight Championship. After the match, Hogan, Elizabeth and Savage celebrated Savage's WWF Championship win.

Reception

The attendance for the event was announced as 19,199, with a total of $1,400,000 in admission fees. This total was significantly reduced from that of the previous year's event, which sat at 93,173, and was similar to the following year's 20,369. It drew a 6.5 PPV buyrate, which was reduced from 8.0 the previous year.

WrestleMania IV received mixed to poor reviews from critics. Most reviews criticized the show's length as well as the number of matches.

Rob McNew from 411Mania.com gave the show a 3.5/10 rating when reviewing the show, claiming the show was "bad". McNew was frustrated by the number of matches on the show, and the size of the tournament, saying "This show could have been so much better had they trimmed the tournament down to eight guys from fourteen. Instead, we got a bunch of short matches, none of which ended up being memorable. The show had its moments and isn't all terrible. Just way too long. Savage-Dibiase provides a great moment, but the rest of the show is a pass." Retoprowrestling.com was also highly critical of the show's length, calling it "a chore to watch", and that "there's probably nothing wrong with a wrestling pay per view running nigh on four hours, but when about three and a half of those hours don't actually feature much in the way of entertainment, it often feels like you've spent your entire weekend just watching this one show."

John Canton of TJR wrestling called the event "a below-average show", citing the event being "a 16 match card. That’s too many matches." Canton also commented on the length of these matches, and primary usage of "rest holds", and bad finishes. Bryan Rose from Voices of Wrestling called the show a "dud", before stating there was a "lot of nothing for 3 1/2 hours." Rose also suggested similarities that the event's length had to watch two Godfather films. Mike Powell of prowrestling.net called the event "really bad", and commented that had the show been less than three hours in length, rather than 4, it would have been an allround better show. 

However, John Powell, from SLAM! Wrestling called the event "excellent", saying that the show's greatness comes from its unpredictability. Powell,  says that the show was "another tricky venture for Vince McMahon and he hits the jackpot again." Powell was very positive about the show's tournament, stating that it and Savage's title win was the highlights of the night. Bret Mix from Wrestling DVD Network commented on the structure of the event, before calling the event "average", but "underrated" for its high quality of matches throughout the show, despite the number of matches.

As an event in the annual WrestleMania series of events, WrestleMania IV is considered to be one of the weaker events; with reviews commenting that the event was most notable for a year-long feud between Randy Savage and Hulk Hogan that preceded the event, with the two facing off a year later at WrestleMania V. Scott Keith of SmarK rant gave the event a "recommendation to avoid", and commented it was "long, boring (and) dull", and that the event was simply to "serve as a prelude to WrestleMania V"

Aftermath
In the months that followed the event, Savage defended the WWF World Heavyweight Championship on multiple occasions, primarily against DiBiase but also granted title shots to others such as the One Man Gang and Bad News Brown. Hogan, meanwhile, took a leave of absence from the WWF during the late spring and part of the summer to film the movie No Holds Barred. André the Giant was shortly placed in a feud with "Hacksaw" Jim Duggan, however, the DiBiase-André alliance was renewed when the two attacked Savage during a television taping for the WWF's syndicated show Superstars of Wrestling. DiBiase and Andre offered a tag team match to Savage at the inaugural SummerSlam, where Savage chose to partner Hogan and create "The Mega Powers". The team of Hogan and Savage won the match before Savage turned heel against Hogan at The Main Event II. Hogan challenged Savage for the WWF World Heavyweight Championship at WrestleMania V, with Hogan winning the title.

Having interfered in Duggan's match at the event, Hacksaw confronted André, and attacked him with his 2x4. This storyline came to an end before Superstars of Wrestling. Having wrestled to a time limit draw in the championship tournament, Jake Roberts and Rick Rude were placed into a feud regarding Rude making kayfabe advances over Robert's real-life wife, Cheryl. The Honky Tonk Man continued to feud with Brutus Beefcake over the Intercontinental Heavyweight Championship during the spring and summer of 1988, with Honky retaining the championship by being intentionally counted out or disqualified on multiple occasions. Beefcake was granted a "final" match at SummerSlam, but was sneak attacked by Ron Bass one week before the event. Honky then lost his championship at Summerslam to a returning Ultimate Warrior.

Demolition defended the tag team championships against both Strike Force and The British Bulldogs. The Demolition-Strike Force feud came to an end in June 1988 when, during a televised match, Ax and Smash kayfabe injured Rick Martel by repeatedly using their finishing move, the "Demolition Decapitation" on him. Following this, The British Bulldogs and The Young Stallions, and later another power team, The Powers of Pain (The Barbarian and The Warlord), became Demolition's primary challengers. Following Bret Hart's elimination from the battle royal, he returned to the ring to challenge Bad News Brown. Bret saw a face turn, alongside partner Jim Neidhart. The pair also engaged in a new feud with The Fabulous Rougeaus.

Bam Bam Bigelow continued his feud with One Man Gang until the summer of 1988, when Bigelow (and Oliver Humperdink) left the WWF for Jim Crockett Promotions in September 1988, just before Ted Turner's purchase of JCP to form WCW.

WrestleMania IV was later released on VHS, and became the only WrestleMania event to be released over two VHS tapes. The event was later released in 2014 on the WWE Network.

Results

Tournament bracket

Pin-Pinfall; CO-Countout; DQ-Disqualification; DDQ-Double disqualification

Notes

References

External links

 

1988 in sports in New Jersey
1988 WWF pay-per-view events
Events in Atlantic City, New Jersey
March 1988 events in the United States
Professional wrestling in New Jersey
WrestleMania